Azeem Abdulai (born 9 December 2002) is a Scottish footballer who plays as a midfielder for Swansea.

Career

Abdulai started his career with Swansea. On 9 August 2022, Abdulai debuted for Swansea during a 2–2 loss on penalties to Oxford United.

References

External links

 

2002 births
Living people
Swansea City A.F.C. players
Association football midfielders